Porga (Greek: Ποργά) or Porin (Greek: Πορίνος) was an early ruler of the Croats who was baptized during the reign of Heraclius (610–641).

Etymology
Early scholars like Henry Hoyle Howorth believed that Porga was the son of one of five brothers of White Croats who had left White Croatia. They noted that the name was uncommon and probably not of Slavic origin. Slovak historian Pavel Jozef Šafárik compared the name to Purgas, which was the name of a Mordvins chief mentioned in 1229. Howorth considered that the Croats were subject to "alien princes, perhaps of Avar descent". Franjo Rački considered that Porga could have been a foreign transcription of the Slavic name Borko. Vladimir Mažuranić noted that it was a genuine personal name which was attested in medieval Kingdom of Croatia at least since 12th as well Banate and Kingdom of Bosnia since 13th century in the form of Porug (Porugh de genere Boić, nobilis de Tetachich near terrae Mogorovich), Poruga, Porča, Purća / Purča, and Purđa (vir nobilis nomine Purthio quondam Streimiri).

Recently, Serbian linguist Aleksandar Loma and historian Tibor Živković also argued that the name comes from the Iranian phrase pouru-gâo, translated as "rich in cattle". Croatian historian and archaeologist Ante Milošević proposed a new thesis, that the differences in names in chapters 30 and 31 of De Administrando Imperio are due to differences in the folk tradition. According to Milošević, chapter 30 resembles the tradition of the Longobards, whose first legendary rulers – Godin, Peron, and Klafon – were not actual historical figures, but deities equivalent to Norse Odin and Balto-Slavic Perun. In chapter 30, Porin – like Longobard Peron, although probably intended as Porga – wasn't an actual ruler name, but the Slavic deity Perun. Hence, Porin and Porga were two different variants of the deity Perun, and not one or two names of separate historical rulers. The thesis was subsequently supported by Denis J. Alimov, who noted that the name of 13th-century Mordvin chief Purgas derives from the deity of thunder Purgin, as well in the 10th-century Kievan Rus Perun became the supreme deity associated with the ruler.

History

De Administrando Imperio
According to Constantine VII (r. 913 to 959) in De Administrando Imperio Porga was baptized during the reign of Emperor Heraclius (r. 610–641) Chapter 30, 2.10, says, "From that time they remained independent and autonomous, and they requested holy baptism from Rome, so bishops were sent to baptize them in the time of their archon Πορίνου (Porinou)". Chapter 31, 1.4, says, "These same Croats had the father of Ποργα (Porga) for their archon at that time", and, 1.5, "The Emperor Heraclius ordered and brought priests from Rome, and made of them an archbishop and a bishop and presbyters and deacons, and baptized the Croats; at that time these Croats had Porga for their archon."

However, the baptism had little impact as the White Croats were eventually baptized again, this time by Rome, after they had defeated the Avars in 677 and had already settled in the province of Dalmatia throwing off the Frankish authority. The conquest was led by five brothers: Kloukas (Κλουκας), Lobelos (Λόβελος), Kosentzis (Κοσέντζης), Mouchlo (Μουχλώ), Chrobatos (Χρωβάτος), and two sisters Touga (Τουγά) and Bouga (Βουγά).

Dates
Živković pointed out that Porga could not be Borna (r. 810–821) or Branimir (879–892), with whom the older generation of scholars have tried to identify him. The change of noble personal names, which shifted from Iranian (or another language of different origin) to Slavic, simply could not have happened in a mere few generations. As such, the time of the White Croat conquest of the Avars is estimated to be during the 7th, and not 9th, century. Missing the chronology, the early scholar Henry Hoyle Howorth believed that Porga was the son of one of the five brothers mentioned in chapter 30 who had left White Croatia. Working on that assumption, Croatian historian Ivo Omrčanin believed that Porga would have ruled in ca. 660–680, while his father would have ruled ca. 635–660. Serbian historian Tibor Živković noted therefore that since the earliest possible date of Croat arrival would have been ca. 630, the baptism had to be before 638, while Heraclius was still on good terms with the pope. However, that would mean that the Croats had two archons at the time of Heraclius, and would rule for six or seven years, which is unlikely. Živković, based on De Administrando Imperio, thinks that the Croats' baptism is connected to Constans II (r. 641–668), as the event that distinguishes the father of Porga (Heraclius I) from Porga (Heraclius Constantine).

See also 

 List of rulers of Croatia

References

Sources

 
 
 

7th-century Croatian people
7th-century rulers in Europe
7th-century Slavs
Slavic pagans
Converts to Christianity from pagan religions
Founding monarchs
Slavic warriors
Dukes of Croatia